The Coupe de France 1977–78 was its 61st edition. It was won by Nancy which defeated OGC Nice in the Final.

Round of 16

Quarter-finals

Semi-finals
First round

Second round

Final

References

French federation

1977–78 domestic association football cups
1977–78 in French football
1977-78